Dagi was an ancient Egyptian vizier during the reign of pharaoh Mentuhotep II of the Eleventh Dynasty.

Dagi is mainly known from his tomb in Western Thebes (TT103), which was once decorated with paintings and reliefs. From the reliefs only small fragments were found while there are some substantial remains of the paintings. In the tomb decoration he appears with the titles of a vizier. In the tomb was also found his decorated sarcophagus (now in the Cairo Egyptian Museum) on which he appears with the title overseer of the gateway. This was his office most likely before he became vizier. His name and these titles also appear on reliefs found in the mortuary temple of Mentuhotep II at Deir el-Bahari. These fragments provide the evidence that he was in office under this king.

Literature 
 James P. Allen: The high officials of the early Middle Kingdom. In: N. Strudwick, J. Taylor (Hrsg.): The Theban Necropolis. London 2003, p. 22 
Wolfram Grajetzki: Court Officials of the Egyptian Middle Kingdom, London 2009 p. 26 

Viziers of the Eleventh Dynasty of Egypt
Year of birth missing
Year of death missing